Mpanjaka albovirida is a moth of the family of Erebidae that is found in North Madagascar.

The male has a wingspan of 27–34 mm and the length of the frontwings is 13 to 15mm.

References

Erebidae
Noctuoidea
Lymantriinae
Moths of Madagascar
Moths of Africa
Moths described in 1970